Agta may refer to:

 Agta language of the Philippine island of Luzon
 Agta people, of the Philippines
 Kapre, of the Philippines
 Balay sa Agta (House of the Agta), a cave and tourist attraction in the southeastern town of Argao, Cebu, Philippines

See also
 Agt (disambiguation)
 Agata (disambiguation)